Mr. Lunasicc is the debut album by American rapper, Lunasicc. It was released July 8, 1997, on AWOL Records and distributed by Noo Trybe Records. The album features production from DJ Daryl, Bobby G, Willie Trump Tight Charles and Pizzo. It peaked at number 92 on the Billboard Top R&B/Hip-Hop Albums chart. One single was released, "Hard Times" featuring Probable Cauze and Ephriam Galloway, which peaked at No. 8 on the Bubbling Under R&B/Hip-Hop Songs chart, making it each of the artists' only charting single to date.

Track listing 
"The Funk is On" (featuring C-Bo & Marvaless) - 4:15  
"Gangsta Shit" (featuring Pizzo, Levitti & Lil Ric) - 5:47  
"Consequences" (featuring Laroo) - 5:02  produce by Willie Trump Tight Charles
"Mobbin' in da 916" - 4:56 produce by Willie Trump Tight Charles 
"Pose No Threat" (featuring Da Misses) - 4:51 produce by Willie Trump Tight Charles) 
"Hard Times" (featuring Probable Cauze & Ephriam Galloway) - 4:28  
"What U Ask Foe" - 4:17 produce by Willie Trump Tight Charles 
"Mr. Lunasicc" - 4:47 produce by Willie Trump Tight Charles 
"So Serious" (featuring Da Misses) - 4:37  produce by Willie Trump Tight Charles 
"Hardcore Nigga" - 4:17  
"It Don't Stop" (featuring Killa Tay & Marvaless) - 5:13  
"Capp Pillas" (featuring Laroo, Flow & Pizzo) - 5:54  
"Don't Want No Funk" (featuring Blacc) - 5:15  produce by Willie Trump Tight Charles
"Face Reality" (featuring 151) - 4:29  D-Whiz, produce by Willie Trump Tight Charles
"Betta Get Her" (featuring Probable Cauze) - 4:39  
"4 tha Bizzness" (featuring Laroo & JT the Bigga Figga) - 4:23

Chart history

References

External links 
 Mr. Lunasicc at Discogs

Luni Coleone albums
1997 debut albums